This is a list of people who have held the post of Lord Lieutenant of County Galway. 

There were lieutenants of counties in Ireland until the reign of James II, when they were renamed governors. The office of Lord Lieutenant was recreated on 23 August 1831 and was abolished in 1922, when Galway ceased to be part of the United Kingdom.

Governors

 William Trench, 1st Earl of Clancarty
 Denis Daly: –1791
 Henry de Burgh, 1st Marquess of Clanricarde: 1792–1797
 Joseph Henry Blake, 1st Baron Wallscourt: 1798–1803
 Richard Trench, 2nd Earl of Clancarty: 1802–1831
 John Prendergast Smyth, 1st Viscount Gort: 1812–1817
 Charles Vereker, 2nd Viscount Gort: 1814–1831

Lord Lieutenants
 The 1st Marquess of Clanricarde:  7 October 1831 – 10 April 1874
 The 3rd Baron Clonbrock: 28 May 1874 – June 1892
 The 4th Baron Clonbrock: 13 June 1892 – 12 May 1917
 The 2nd Baron Killanin: 17 April 1918 – 1922

References

Galway
History of County Galway
Politics of County Galway